Land, Gold and Women is a documentary about the conditions of typical women in rural Pakistan. It chronicles the traditional use of ritual gang rape as a method of social control. Central to the film are the stories of Mukhtar Mai, and Dr. Shazia Khalid.  The documentary was first broadcast on 5 March 2006.

Mai and Khalid
Mukhtar was an illiterate woman from a poor farming family. A more highly placed family perceived a slight by her younger brother, who was believed to have been interested in a daughter of a more high-class family. A tribal council ordered Mukhtar to report to the other family, to apologize for her brother. When she arrived, she was taken captive, and gang-raped for several days.

Shazia Khalid was working as a medical doctor in an isolated region of Pakistan. When she was raped, she found that she could not get officials to initiate an inquiry.

Reception
The documentary was awarded a gold medal at the New York Film Festival in 2007.

References

Canadian documentary television films
Documentary films about violence against women
Gang rape in Pakistan
2006 documentary films
2006 films
British documentary films
Documentary films about Pakistan
Films about rape
Women in Pakistan
2000s Canadian films
2000s British films